"Thank Heaven for Little Girls" is a 1957 song written by Alan Jay Lerner and Frederick Loewe and associated with Maurice Chevalier, its original performer. It opened and closed the 1958 film Gigi. Alfred Drake performed the song in the 1973 Broadway stage production of Gigi, and in the 2015 revival, it was sung as a duet between Victoria Clark and Dee Hoty.

The Chevalier version is often regarded as the definitive version of the song; he recorded it in 1958. In 2004, it finished at #56 on AFI's 100 Years...100 Songs survey of top tunes in American cinema.

Bing Crosby recorded the song for his radio show in 1960 and it subsequently was released on the CD Songs I Wish I Had Sung the First Time Around... (2014). It has been performed by Rosemary Clooney, Perry Como, Gérard Depardieu, Merle Haggard, Hugh Hefner, The King Brothers, Ed McMahon, and in his faux French accent, Peter Sellers. In the Happy Days season 5 episode "Be My Valentine" (February 14, 1978), a then-18-year-old Scott Baio sang it as part of a series of musical numbers commemorating Valentine's Day. In the 1997 film Wag the Dog, the song performed by Chevalier is used as backdrop for an election campaign ad. 

In the mid-1990s, a contemporary take on the song was recorded by the Seattle-based alternative band Ruby for a Mountain Dew commercial in the United States. This recording was later used by PepsiCo for its Pepsi Max brand in the United Kingdom.

References

Songs from musicals
Songs about children
1957 songs
Songs written for films
1950s jazz standards
Maurice Chevalier songs
Songs with music by Frederick Loewe
Songs with lyrics by Alan Jay Lerner